Serge Atakayi (born 30 January 1999) is a professional footballer who plays for League of Ireland Premier Division club St Patrick's Athletic as a winger. Originally from the Democratic Republic of the Congo, he represented his adopted country of Finland up to under-19 level, before being called up by his country of birth in 2019 to play for the DR Congo U23 team.

Early life
Atakayi, originally from Democratic Republic of the Congo, applied for asylum in Finland alongside other members of his youth football team when visiting the country in 2010.

Club career

FF Jaro
Atakayi joined the youth system at FF Jaro in 2013 and made his senior debut for the club in 2015. He became the youngest goalscorer in the history of the Finnish top flight when he scored against HIFK on 17 May 2015, aged 16 years and 107 days.

Rangers
On 31 August 2016, after trial periods with Leicester City and Fulham, he joined Rangers on a three-year contract. He signed a one-year contract extension to tie him to Rangers until 2020 in June 2018. He made his debut against Motherwell in a 7–1 win during November 2018 but suffered a broken ankle in the game.

SJK
Atakayi left Rangers on 30 December 2019 to join Finnish side SJK for a reported fee of £100,000. Atakayi played in 19 games on the 2020 season and scored once. On June 4 2021 it was told by SJK-head coach Jani Honkavaara that Atakayi had not been training with the team since February because of attitude problems.  Atakayi only played in one Finnish Cup game for SJK in the 2021 season. On 28 July 2021 he moved to TPS on loan.

St Patrick's Athletic
On 15 July 2022 it was announced that Atakayi had signed for League of Ireland Premier Division club St Patrick's Athletic on an 18 month contract for an undisclosed fee. He made his debut on the same day, in a 1–1 draw with Dundalk at Richmond Park. His first goal for the club came on 4 August 2022 when he scored an 87th minute winner away to CSKA Sofia in the UEFA Europa Conference League Third qualifying round. On 14 August 2022, he scored the winning goal against Sligo Rovers at Richmond Park in what was his first league start for the club. On 19 August 2022, he scored the winning goal in a 2–1 victory away to UCD, his third goal in his last four games. On 14 October 2022, he opened the scoring in a 3–1 win over Dublin rivals Bohemians. He followed that up a week later by again opening the scoring in another Dublin derby, this time away to Shamrock Rovers at Tallaght Stadium.

International career

Finland
Atakayi was born in DR Congo but obtained Finnish citizenship in 2016 and represented Finland at under-15 level. In June 2016, Atakayi represented Finland at under-18 level in the Baltic Cup and scored in a 2–2 draw with Lithuania on 2 June 2016. He made his debut for the Finland under-19 side on 4 September 2016, in a goalless draw with Romania.

DR Congo
While living in Glasgow, Atakayi become close friends with compatriot Youssouf Mulumbu who was playing for Celtic at the time and was a senior international for DR Congo. Mulumbu spoke with Atakayi about changing his international allegiance to his birth country. In March 2019, Atakayi was called up to the DR Congo U23 team for two 2019 Africa U-23 Cup of Nations qualification fixtures against Morocco U23. The first leg at home in Kinshasa represented a first opportunity for Atakayi to return home to see his family since seeking asylum from the country in 2010.

Career statistics

References

External links

1999 births
Living people
Footballers from Kinshasa
Finnish footballers
Finland youth international footballers
Democratic Republic of the Congo footballers
Democratic Republic of the Congo emigrants to Finland
Finnish people of Democratic Republic of the Congo descent
Finnish expatriate footballers
Rangers F.C. players
FF Jaro players
Jakobstads BK players
Seinäjoen Jalkapallokerho players
St Patrick's Athletic F.C. players
Scottish Professional Football League players
Ykkönen players
Kakkonen players
Veikkausliiga players
League of Ireland players
Association football forwards
Expatriate footballers in Scotland
Finnish expatriate sportspeople in Scotland
Naturalized citizens of Finland
Expatriate association footballers in the Republic of Ireland